Myrmica hellenica is a species of ant belonging to the family Formicidae.

It is native to Europe, Eastern Asia and Northern America.

References

Myrmica
Insects described in 1926